The 1906 South Australian Football Association season was the 30th season of the top-level Australian rules football competition in South Australia.

Ladder

References 

SAFA
South Australian National Football League seasons